Damir Ceter Valencia (born 2 November 1997) is a Colombian football player who plays as forward for Italian  club Bari.

Career
On 12 January 2018, Ceter signed with Italian club Cagliari. He made his Serie A debut in the match against Benevento.

On 28 July 2018, Ceter joined to Olbia on loan until 30 June 2019.

On 8 July 2019, Ceter signed to Serie B side ChievoVerona on loan until 30 June 2020.

On 8 September 2020, Ceter was loaned to Serie B side Pescara, as part of a player exchange that saw Gabriele Zappa move to Cagliari.

On 26 July 2022, Ceter signed a one-year contract with Bari.

References

1997 births
Living people
Colombian footballers
Colombia under-20 international footballers
Categoría Primera A players
Categoría Primera B players
Serie A players
Serie B players
Serie C players
Universitario Popayán footballers
Deportes Quindío footballers
Independiente Santa Fe footballers
Cagliari Calcio players
Olbia Calcio 1905 players
A.C. ChievoVerona players
Delfino Pescara 1936 players
S.S.C. Bari players
Association football forwards
Colombian expatriate footballers
Expatriate footballers in Italy
Colombian expatriate sportspeople in Italy
People from Buenaventura, Valle del Cauca
Sportspeople from Valle del Cauca Department